"One More Try" is a song recorded by the British singer George Michael from his debut solo studio album, Faith (1987). It was released on 11 April 1988 as the album's fourth single by Columbia Records. The song hit number one on all of the Billboard Hot 100, the Hot Black Singles and the Hot Adult Contemporary charts.

Background
A ballad at almost six minutes in length, the song lyrically explores a young man's hesitancy to enter/revisit a new relationship because he had been emotionally hurt so many times previously. The song concludes with temptation taking over, and Michael ends by singing the title for the only time. In 1988, Michael told Countdown that the song was written, recorded and finished within 8 hours. 

"One More Try" remained a live favourite at Michael's concerts in the years which followed including a live gospel version performed at Wembley Arena on 1 Dec 1993 as part of The Concert of Hope, although its radio airplay tends to be restricted to specific "Love Songs"–esque features because of both the tempo and the length.

Music video
Filmmaker Tony Scott directed the simple music video for the song, which features George singing alone in an empty room. The first shot of the video alone lasts a little over two minutes, ending at the beginning of the second verse. Throughout, a grey-blue light can be seen shining into his window, a metaphor for loneliness. In another scene, he attempts to draw a heart on his bathroom cabinet's glass door, but cannot finish the heart, as at this point, sadness and grief have taken over. His furniture can also be seen with drapes over each piece, as well as the curtains drawn, another lonely metaphor.

The video was filmed at The Carrington Hotel in New South Wales, Australia, which was empty and derelict at the time.

Chart performance
It reached number 8 on the UK Singles Chart and became his sixth number one on the Billboard Hot 100 in the US. Four of the six singles issued from Faith went to number one in America, while by comparison, none managed to do so in the UK.

"One More Try" was the third consecutive number one single from the Faith album. "One More Try" debuted at an impressive number 40 the week of 16 April 1988, and matching the speed of "Father Figure", reached number one by its seventh week, 28 May 1988, this time staying there for three consecutive weeks. "One More Try" was the second-longest running number one of 1988, tied with "Every Rose Has Its Thorn" by Poison, and behind the four-week run of Steve Winwood's "Roll with It". In total, "One More Try" spent seven weeks in the top 10 and 14 weeks in the top 40 of the Billboard Hot 100, out of a total of 18 weeks. It was a triple-chart number one, also topping the then-Hot Black Singles chart and the Adult Contemporary charts, and becoming the last number-one single on the now-Hot R&B/Hip-Hop Songs chart by a white male artist until Robin Thicke's "Lost Without U" (2007).

Track listing
"One More Try" 
"One More Try" (album version) – 5:50
"Look at Your Hands" – 4:36

Charts and certifications

Weekly charts

Year-end charts

All-time charts

Certifications

Divine version

In 1999, American teen trio Divine recorded the song as their second single off their debut album Fairy Tales.

Track listing
"One More Try" – 6:00
"One More Try" (extended version) – 9:00
"One More Try" (a cappella version) – 4:50

Charts

Beverley Knight version

British singer and songwriter Beverley Knight covered "One More Try" and released it as the third single release from her seventh studio album, Soul UK, a tribute to UK soul artists. It was released in the UK on 23 October 2011. The B-sides are remixes of Freeez's single "Southern Freeez", the original of which also appears on Soul UK.

Background
In regards to her version of "One More Try", Knight said "Everyone knew who George Michael was, but this song is when he became the real thing in my mind. He channelled a gospel sound, black America, ate it up, Britain followed and then the whole world. I took that sound, and going back to my own church roots, I ran with it." George Michael endorsed Knight's version of "One More Try" stating, "I'm always flattered by cover versions of my songs – especially when they are sung as beautifully as this. Thank You Beverley".

Track listing
Digital download
 "One More Try" (Album Version) – 5:43
 "Southern Freeez" (Soulseekers Club Mix) – 7:17
 "Southern Freeez" (Soulseekers Radio Edit) – 3:28
 "Southern Freeez" (MCM Funky Freeez Radio Edit) – 3:18

iTunes digital download
 "One More Try" (Album Version) – 5:43
 "Southern Freeez" (Soulseekers Club Mix) – 7:17
 "Southern Freeez" (Soulseekers Dub) – 7:17
 "Southern Freeez" (MCM Funky Freeez Radio Edit) – 3:18

Other versions
 "One More Try" (Radio Edit)

Release history

Other cover versions
1997: Joan Baez
2000: Divine
2003: Hazel O'Connor for her first-ever official best of compilation, A Singular Collection
2011: Iron & Wine (for The A.V. Clubs "A.V. Undercover" series)
2011: Stacy Francis on first season of The X Factor USA
2011: Beverley Knight
2014: Mariah Carey recorded the song for her album Me. I Am Mariah... The Elusive Chanteuse.
2014: Josh Kaufman
2022: Calum Scott
2022: Crosses

References

External links
 George Michael - official website

1987 songs
1988 singles
1999 singles
2011 singles
George Michael songs
Billboard Hot 100 number-one singles
Cashbox number-one singles
1980s ballads
Pop ballads
Contemporary R&B ballads
Soul ballads
Blue-eyed soul songs
Songs written by George Michael
Song recordings produced by George Michael
RPM Top Singles number-one singles
Beverley Knight songs
Epic Records singles
Columbia Records singles
Mariah Carey songs